"Not Exactly" is an instrumental by Canadian electronic music producer Deadmau5. It was released as the second single from his third studio album, Random Album Title. First released on August 27, 2007, "Not Exactly" became the second release on Deadmau5's label Mau5trap.

Background and composition
"Not Exactly" is a progressive house song with a tempo of 128 beats per minute and is written in the key of F major.

The single charted in the US Dance/Electronic Digital Song Sales Chart two years after its release, peaking at position #46. The song also won the Beatport Music Award for "Best Single" in 2008.

Formats and track listings

Charts

Release history

References

External links
 deadmau5.com
 
 
 
 

2007 singles
Deadmau5 songs
Electronic songs
House music songs
2007 songs
Songs written by Deadmau5